The Man Upstairs is a 1926 American silent comedy film directed by Roy Del Ruth and starring Monte Blue. It was produced and distributed by Warner Brothers. The film is based on the 1916 novel The Agony Column by Earl Derr Biggers.

Plot
As described in a film magazine review, adventurer and traveler Geoffrey West has a passion for "The Agony Column" of the newspaper, which lists advertisements for missing friends and relatives, and uses the personals to get acquainted with Marion Larnard, whom he sees in a London hotel. She invites him to write her a daily letter for five days to prove whether his acquaintance is worth cultivating. Taking this as his cue, in these letters he begins a mystery story to show her that he is an interesting fellow and leads her to believe that he has murdered Captain Fraser-Freer until she understands that it was intended as an elaborate joke on her. Marion then, with the aid of the army officer who pretends to be dead, turns the table on Geoffrey and gives him a scare in return by having him arrested and put in jail. However, just as he is about to be charged, he is able to explain the situation to the police, that it was a joke, and the officer and the young women help get him released. In the end Geoffrey proves that he is indeed worthy of Marion's affections.

Cast
Monte Blue as Geoffrey West
Dorothy Devore as Marion Larnard
Helen Dunbar as Aunt Hattie
John Roche as Captain Fraser-Freer
Stanley Taylor as Norman Fraser-Freer
Carl Stockdale as Enright
Heinie Conklin as Mose (credited as Charles Conklin)

Box Office
According to Warner Bros records, the film earned $151,000 in domestic and $29,000 in foreign markets.

Preservation
With no prints of The Man Upstairs located in any film archives, it is a lost film.

References

External links

1926 films
American silent feature films
Lost American films
Films directed by Roy Del Ruth
Warner Bros. films
American black-and-white films
1926 comedy films
Silent American comedy films
1926 lost films
Lost comedy films
1920s American films